Bruce Fountain (23 April 1920 – 14 June 2011) was  a former Australian rules footballer who played with Footscray in the Victorian Football League (VFL).

Notes

External links 
		

1920 births
2011 deaths
Australian rules footballers from Victoria (Australia)
Western Bulldogs players